Ferdinand Fritsch (29 March 1898 - 1966/67) was an Austrian football manager.

Football

Fritsch's first known job in football was with Arka Gdynia in 1950. Fritsch joined Arka's rivals Lechia Gdańsk in 1953, taking up the role while they were in the top flight of Polish football. His time at Lechia was unsuccessful with the team only winning 2 of his 18 games in charge. From leaving Lechia in 1953, Fritsch's next documented job was with Grazer AK in Austria in 1960 before leaving the role in 1962.

Death

Little is known about Fritsch's death, only that he died aged 68 in Vienna, Austria. This places his year of death in either 1966 or 1967.

References 

1898 births
Austrian football managers
Arka Gdynia managers
Lechia Gdańsk managers
Grazer AK managers
1960s deaths